Joseph de Riquet de Caraman, 17th Prince de Chimay (20 August 1808, Paris – 12 March 1886, London) was a Belgian diplomat and industrialist.

Family
The eldest son of François Joseph de Riquet de Caraman, prince de Chimay and his wife Thérésa Cabarrus (Madame Tallien), Joseph married Émilie Pellapra (1806–1871) in Paris on 30 August 1830. She was the widow of comte de Brigode and with her Joseph had four children:

 Marie Thérèse Emilie (1832–1851), countess of Lagrange, wife of Frédéric Lagrange ;
 Marie Joseph Guy Henry Philippe (1836–1892) (married Marie de Montesquiou-Fezensac then Mathilde de Barandiaran) ;
 Valentine (1839–1914), married Paul de Bauffremont then George Bibescu ;
 Eugène (1847–1881) (married Louise de Graffenried-Villars, (1842–1901)).

Life
He led the negotiations which led to a treaty of friendship between the Netherlands and Belgium following William I of the Netherlands' abjuration, which guaranteed Belgian independence. He also contributed to establishing Belgium's diplomatic relations with the Grand Duchy of Tuscany, the Kingdom of Naples, the Papal States and the German Confederation.

In 1852 he acquired the Hôtel de la Pagerie at 17 quai Malaquais, in the 6th arrondissement of Paris, renaming it Hôtel de Chimay. It was sold in 1883 to the École des beaux-arts. In 1863 he built a theatre in his château de Chimay in Belgium, designed by Hector-Martin Lefuel and Cambon and inspired by Louis XV's theatre at the Palace of Fontainebleau.

He financed the foundation of Scourmont Abbey on Chimay lands and in 1858 headed the consortium which founded the Compagnie de Chimay, one of the first Belgian railway companies, which built a line linking Chimay to Anor in France and Mariembourg.

Sources
http://www.odis.be/lnk/PS_27432

References

1808 births
1886 deaths
Joseph
19th-century Belgian businesspeople
Belgian diplomats